Xanthodisca vibius, the Vibius orange and Vibius skipper, is a butterfly in the family Hesperiidae. It is found in Cameroon, Equatorial Guinea, Gabon, the Democratic Republic of the Congo, Uganda, western Kenya, eastern Tanzania, Malawi, north-western and north-eastern Zambia and Zimbabwe. The habitat consists of forests and moist dense woodland, especially Brachystegia woodland.

Adults are known to mud-puddle. They are on wing from January to May.

The larvae feed on Aframomum species.

References

Erionotini
Butterflies of Africa
Butterflies described in 1878
Taxa named by William Chapman Hewitson